This article lists events that occurred during 1993 in Estonia.

Incumbents
President - Lennart Meri
Prime Minister - Mart Laar

Events
 27 May – The Supreme Court of Estonia resumes its operations after the end of the Soviet occupation of Estonia. Instead of Tallinn where it had operated in 1935–1940, it is moved back to Tartu where it had operated in 1920–1935.
 10 September – Pope John Paul II visits Estonia and Latvia.

Births
14 June - Svetlana Issakova, figure skater

See also
 1993 in Estonian football
 1993 in Estonian television

References

 
1990s in Estonia
Estonia
Estonia
Years of the 20th century in Estonia